Cristian Osvaldo Zarco (born 20 April 1996) is an Argentine professional footballer who plays as a forward.

Career
Zarco began his career in Platense's ranks. He made his professional bow for the Primera B Metropolitana club on 10 May 2014 against Colegiales, coming off the substitutes bench in place of Jonathan Páez as the fixture ended 2–2. His first start arrived on 25 May versus Deportivo Armenio, with Platense finishing the 2013–14 campaign fourth; eventually losing in the play-off final to Temperley. Platense did, however, win promotion four years later in 2017–18, a season Zarco scored his first senior goal during a victory away to Almirante Brown in September 2017; in what was his twenty-sixth appearance for the club. He departed Quilmes in June 2019.

Career statistics
.

Honours
Platense
Primera B Metropolitana: 2017–18

References

External links

1996 births
Living people
Place of birth missing (living people)
Argentine footballers
Association football forwards
Primera B Metropolitana players
Club Atlético Platense footballers